"Lipstick on Your Collar" is a song written by Brill Building staff writers Edna Lewis (lyrics) and George Goehring (music) which was a 1959 hit single for Connie Francis.

History
In a 1959 interview, Connie Francis attributed her being the sole songstress then scoring rock and roll hits by saying: "Rock 'n' roll is a masculine kind of music" with its mindset of "'Come on out baby we're going to rock'...[best] suited for a man to sing...The mistake that many girl singers have made is trying to compete with the men [whereas] I've tried for the cute angle in lyrics, things like 'Lipstick on Your Collar' and 'Stupid Cupid'."

Songwriter George Goehring recalled in 1982 that he had personally pitched "Lipstick on Your Collar" to Francis, when he made an unannounced visit to her New Jersey home and played the song for her on her piano.

Francis recorded the song April 15, 1959 in a session at Metropolitan Studio (NYC) produced and conducted by Ray Ellis, with veteran guitarist George Barnes contributing a solo to the track. At the same session Francis recorded the romantic ballad "Frankie", a Howard Greenfield/Neil Sedaka composition meant to appeal to Frankie Avalon fans. "Lipstick on Your Collar" was originally intended to serve as the B-side to "Frankie", but MGM Records and Francis herself were so pleased with the recording that the two tracks were both promoted equally.

The result was the most successful double-sided hit of Francis' career, as "Lipstick on Your Collar" – the first uptempo Connie Francis single to reach the US Top Ten – peaked at No. 5 on the Billboard Hot 100 in July 1959, while "Frankie" peaked at No. 9. "Lipstick on Your Collar" sold over one million copies in the US.

In the summer of 1959 "Lipstick on Your Collar" also reached No. 3 in the UK Singles Chart, and became Francis' first Top Ten hit in Australia at No. 4.

Other versions
The cover version of "Lipstick on Your Collar" for the UK Embassy Records budget disc label was recorded by Maureen Evans.

"Lipstick on Your Collar" was recorded in German by Conny as "Lippenstift am Jacket" which reached #131 in Germany in April 1960 (the single was a double-sided hit with the Rex Gildo duet "Yes, My Darling"). It was the success of the German version of "Lipstick on Your Collar" that alerted Francis to her potential success singing her singles in other languages: she made her first foreign language recording, that being "Everybody's Somebody's Fool" in German, in April 1960.

A Swedish rendering of "Lipstick on Your Collar" entitled "Läppstift På Din Krage", had been recorded in 1959 by respectively Lill-Babs, Mona Grain (sw) and Bibi Johns (sw). Also in 1959 the Danish rendering "Tusind skøre tanker" had been recorded by Grethe & Jørgen Ingmann while Québécois singer Michèle Richard (fr) had recorded the French rendering "Du rouge à levres sur ton collet". The Italian rendering "Rossetto sul colletto" was recorded by Mina for her 1960 album Il cielo in una stanza.

In 1960, the song was covered by Japanese artist Kayoko Moriyama.

"Lipstick on Your Collar" was one of several hits remade by Helen Shapiro on her March 10, 1962 album release Tops With Me.

In 1963, Hong Kong female singer Chang Loo covered this song under the title 妒人的口紅 ("Lipstick on your collar"), alternating between English and Mandarin Chinese, on her LP album An Evening With Chang Loo, an EMI Columbia Records release.

Phyllis Dillon released a reggae version in 1969 on Trojan Records TR-686.

In September 1977 Australian punk rock pioneers the Saints had a single release with their remake of "Lipstick on Your Collar".

The 1981 Elisabeth Andreassen album Angel of the Morning features a cover of "Lipstick on Your Collar".

In 1982, Mud recorded the song.

Dana had a 1987 single release with a remake of "Lipstick on Your Collar" which did not chart.

A Welsh-language version, "Lipstic ar dy Goler", was recorded by violinist Angharad Davies in 1989, and included on her album Y Ferch o'r Filltir Sgwâr.

In 1991 Dutch duo Maywood remade "Lipstick on Your Collar" for their Walking Back to Happiness album.

"Lipstick on Your Collar" was a favorite song to sing for the young Donna Summer.

Other uses
The song was also used in the off-Broadway musical, The Marvelous Wonderettes, a revue of 1950s and 1960s songs.

In 1982 Wisk laundry detergent utilized an adaption of "Lipstick on Your Collar" as a jingle in a radio ad campaign celebrating the product's twenty-fifth anniversary; the lyrics for the Wisk jingle version were composed by George Goehring who'd written the original song's music (but not its lyrics).

Connie Francis' "Lipstick on Your Collar" served as the theme song for the 1993 British television series Lipstick on Your Collar which was set during the Suez Crisis of 1956, three years before Francis' hit single.

References

1959 singles
Connie Francis songs
1959 songs
MGM Records singles
Elisabeth Andreassen songs
Songs about infidelity